R362 road may refer to:
 R362 road (Ireland)
 R362 road (South Africa)